Alessandro "Alex" Ciompi (born 16 June 1985 in Massa Marittima) is an Italian racing driver. He has competed in such series as Euroseries 3000, Formula Renault 3.5 Series and the Italian Formula Three Championship.

Racing record

Complete Formula Renault 3.5 Series results
(key) (Races in bold indicate pole position) (Races in italics indicate fastest lap)

References

External links
 Official website
 

1985 births
Living people
People from Massa Marittima
Italian racing drivers
Italian Formula Renault 2.0 drivers
Italian Formula Three Championship drivers
Auto GP drivers
World Series Formula V8 3.5 drivers
Sportspeople from the Province of Grosseto

Target Racing drivers
EuroInternational drivers
Scuderia Coloni drivers